The Queens High School of Teaching, Liberal Arts and the Sciences (QHST) (26Q566) is a public high school in Glen Oaks, New York, United States. It is located on the Frank A. Padavan Campus, a sprawling  landscaped campus, which contains QHST and two other neighboring kindergarten-8th grade schools: P.S./I.S. 266 and P.S./I.S. 208. It is one of the only schools in New York City that has a campus. The campus—originally named the Glen Oaks Campus—was renamed in 2008 in honor of a state senator who at the time was running for re-election.

The school opened in the fall of 2003. It currently serves grades 9-12.

History and origin
The school was originally planned as a year-round school with short vacations throughout the year, but this plan was later dismissed, and the school now adheres to a standard academic schedule.

The original plan was to enroll 300 freshmen and gradually accept more students each year. Months before its opening, 60 sophomores were admitted as well. At this time Principal Nigel Pugh separated the school into three "small learning communities" (SLCs) to simulate the experience of attending a smaller school.

The campus was originally the site of an extension of Creedmore mental hospital, to which the school has no affiliation. During the 2009–2010 school year, the last few buildings were torn down for a sports field.

On 2 April 2016, the School officially opened the athletic field.

Small Learning Communities 
The school's three Small Learning Communities are named Emerson, Freire, and Montessori. Each has its own teachers, and students mostly attend classes only within their small learning community. Some classes – e.g. art, music, Spanish culture, Spanish - are "cross-community", meaning that students from different communities attend the same class. Montessori and Emerson were once the two biggest communities, having few seniors and an average number of juniors, sophomores, and freshmen, while Freire only had juniors, sophomores and freshmen. This has since changed.

The "Gardner Community" provides special education, and is named after Howard Gardner.

Notable alumni 

 Ella Mai - English singer and songwriter
 Indira Scott - Fashion model

References

External links

NYC Department of Education: Queens High School of Teaching, Liberal Arts and the Sciences



Public high schools in Queens, New York
Educational institutions established in 2003
Glen Oaks, Queens
2003 establishments in New York City